Madame Jealousy is a 1918 American silent allegorical drama film directed by Robert G. Vignola and written by George V. Hobart and Eve Unsell. The film stars Pauline Frederick, Thomas Meighan, Frank Losee, Charles Wellesley, Isabel O'Madigan, and Elsie MacLeod. The film was released on February 4, 1918, by Paramount Pictures.

Plot
As described in a film magazine, always ready to wreck the happiness of human beings, Jealousy (Frederick) selects Charm (MacLeod) and Valor (Meighan) as her two victims. She is almost successful at bringing about her desires, but the arrival of the child Happiness overcomes all disagreements. Jealousy awaits with interest her next victims.

Cast
Pauline Frederick as Madame Jealousy
Thomas Meighan as 	Valour
Frank Losee as Finance
Charles Wellesley as Commerce
Isabel O'Madigan as Pride
Elsie MacLeod as Charm
Ina Rorke as Display
Francesca Cappelano as Mischief
Grace Barton as Sorrow
Eddie Sturgis as Treachery (credited as Edwin Sturgis)
Marcia Harris as Rumor
J.K. Murray as Good Nature

Reception
L.J. Bourstein of Motography wrote: "Miss Frederick again is given opportunity to display her unusual dramatic capabilities and accomplishes another remarkable success [...] Excellent photography has considerable to do with this picture. Many of the numerous camera effects have been executed with precision and bespeaks of the capability of Ned Van Buren, the photographer. Robert Vignola directed and has turned out a very satisfactory and entertaining drama".

Like many American films of the time, Madame Jealousy was subject to cuts by city and state film censorship boards. The Chicago Board of Censors required a cut, in Reel 4, of an intoxicated young woman rising from a table and staggering towards a man.

References

External links

Still at alamy.com

1918 films
1910s English-language films
Silent American drama films
1918 drama films
Paramount Pictures films
Films directed by Robert G. Vignola
American black-and-white films
American silent feature films
1910s American films